Mohamed Al-Aswad (born 6 June 1976) is an Emirati sprinter. He competed in the men's 200 metres at the 1996 Summer Olympics.

References

External links
 

1976 births
Living people
Athletes (track and field) at the 1996 Summer Olympics
Emirati male sprinters
Olympic athletes of the United Arab Emirates
Place of birth missing (living people)
Athletes (track and field) at the 1998 Asian Games
Asian Games competitors for the United Arab Emirates